Peduovirinae is a subfamily of viruses in the order Caudovirales, in the family Myoviridae. Bacteria serve as natural hosts. There are 76 species in this subfamily, assigned to 31 genera.

Taxonomy
The following genera are recognized:

 Aresaunavirus
 Baylorvirus
 Bielevirus
 Canoevirus
 Catalunyavirus
 Citexvirus
 Eganvirus
 Entnonagintavirus
 Felsduovirus
 Hpunavirus
 Irrigatiovirus
 Irtavirus
 Kisquattuordecimvirus
 Kisquinquevirus
 Longwoodvirus
 Nampongvirus
 Novemvirus
 Peduovirus
 Phitrevirus
 Playavirus
 Reginaelenavirus
 Reipivirus
 Senquatrovirus
 Seongnamvirus
 Simpcentumvirus
 Stockinghallvirus
 Tigrvirus
 Vimunumvirus
 Vulnificusvirus
 Xuanwuvirus
 Yongunavirus

Structure
Viruses in Peduovirinae are non-enveloped, with icosahedral and  Head-tail geometries, and T=7 symmetry. The diameter is around 60 nm. Genomes are linear, around 33kb in length. The genome codes for 45 proteins.

Life cycle
Viral replication is cytoplasmic. Entry into the host cell is achieved by adsorption into the host cell. DNA-templated transcription is the method of transcription. The virus exits the host cell by lysis, and holin/endolysin/spanin proteins. Bacteria serve as the natural host. Transmission routes are passive diffusion.

References

External links
 Viralzone: Peduovirinae
 ICTV

 
Myoviridae
Virus subfamilies